Time Is Money is the second studio album by American rapper Styles P. The album was released on December 19, 2006, by Ruff Ryders Entertainment and Interscope Records.

The album suffered several pushbacks starting from spring 2005. It was originally scheduled to be released on November 14, 2006, but was delayed for a month. It peaked at number 19 on the Billboard Top R&B/Hip-Hop Albums chart, number ten on the Top Rap Albums chart, and number 79 on the Billboard 200.

"Can You Believe It", "I'm Black" and "Favorite Drug" were released as singles. The clean version of "Favorite Drug" is titled "Favorite One". A track called "All My Life" which is featuring Akon (who featured Styles P on his hit "Locked Up" two years before) was supposed to be on the album but it didn't make the final cut.

Track listing

Charts

Weekly charts

Year-end charts

References 

Styles P albums
2006 albums
Interscope Records albums
Ruff Ryders Entertainment albums
Albums produced by Scott Storch
Albums produced by Hi-Tek
Albums produced by Havoc (musician)
Albums produced by Lil Jon
Albums produced by Dame Grease
Albums produced by the Alchemist (musician)
Albums produced by Neo da Matrix